A beer bong is a device composed of a funnel attached to a tube used to facilitate the rapid consumption of beer.

Beer bong may also refer to:
 "Beer Bong", a song on the NOFX album Liberal Animation
 "Beer Bong", a song on the Atrophy album Socialized Hate
 Beerbongs & Bentleys, the second studio album by American rapper Post Malone

See also
 Beer (disambiguation)
 Bong (disambiguation)